The 1964–65 season was the 9th season of the Liga Nacional de Baloncesto. Real Madrid won the title.

Teams and venues

League table

Relegation playoffs
Club Águilas remained in the league and Canoe NC was relegated after the relegation playoffs, played with the third and fourth qualified teams in Segunda División (CB Hospitalet, promoted, and CN Vitoria).

Stats Leaders

Points

References

ACB.com 
Linguasport 

Liga Española de Baloncesto (1957–1983) seasons
1964–65 in Spanish basketball